Churchill Braz Alemao (born 16 May 1949) is a former Chief Minister and former MP of the 14th Lok Sabha of India. He was the MLA of Benaulim constituency in the state of Goa.

Political career
Alemao was chief minister of Goa for a brief period in the early 1990s, and later became an MP representing the South Goa (Lok Sabha constituency) from 1996 to 1998.

Founding United Goans Democratic Party
Alemao founded the United Goans Democratic Party as a spinoff of the United Goans Party.

Congress days
In the late 1980s, Alemao quit the United Goans Democratic Party and joined the Indian National Congress. He became Chief Minister for a 18 days as part of the Progressive Democratic Front led by Congress. He had to resign due to an internal split in the party. After that Luis Proto Barbosa became chief minister. Later, Alemao became an MP as Congress leader.

Save Goa Front
In March 2007, Alemao quit Congress and formed a regional party, the Save Goa Front. The party contested 17 seats and won 2, including his seat and Aleixo Lourenco's. After the election, no party won a majority and the Save Goa Front joined the Congress-led alliance to form a government.

Return to Congress
In January 2008, Alemao merged the Save Goa Front with Congress. He continued as an MLA and Minister in Goa during this period.

March 2012 elections
In the March 2012 elections to the Legislative Assembly of Goa, Alemao lost to independent candidate Avertano Furtado by a margin of over 2000 votes. His brother Joaqium Alemao, who was then Minister in the Government of Goa, also lost as he could not retain his Cuncolim constituency. Churchill Alemao's daughter Valanka and Joaquim's son Yuri also lost the 2012 elections. All four candidates from the Alemao family suffered defeat. Churchill Alemao later blamed the then Chief Minister of Goa, Digambar Kamat and the Electronic Voting Machines for his defeat.

Entry into the All India Trinamool Congress
In 2014, after his daughter Valanka Alemao was denied candidature by the Indian National Congress party in the elections to the 16th Lok Sabha from the South Goa, Alemao resigned from the Indian National Congress and announced that he would contest the polls as an independent candidate.

Two days later, Alemao joined the All India Trinamool Congress and was formally inducted in the party by Madan Mitra, a Minister of State in the Government of West Bengal. He contested the elections to the 16th Lok Sabha from the South Goa (Lok Sabha constituency) as a candidate of the All India Trinamool Congress and was defeated by Narendra Keshav Sawaikar of the Bharatiya Janata Party. Alemao polled 11,941 votes in these elections.

Joining Nationalist Congress Party
On 17 October 2016 Alemao joined the Nationalist Congress Party (NCP) and declared his intent to contest the election on the NCP ticket. He won the Benaulim seat in 2017 Goa Legislative Assembly election.

Return to AITC
Alemao again joined AITC on 13 December 2021.

Football
The football team Churchill Brothers, which is currently competing in I-League, is owned by Alemao's family. His daughter Valanka Alemao is current CEO of the club.

References

India MPs 2004–2009
Indian National Congress politicians from Goa
Living people
India MPs 1996–1997
Lok Sabha members from Goa
Trinamool Congress politicians from Goa
Nationalist Congress Party politicians from Goa
Corruption in Goa
Indian prisoners and detainees
Members of the Goa Legislative Assembly
1949 births
Goa MLAs 2017–2022
People from Benaulim
Indian politicians convicted of crimes
United Goans Democratic Party politicians
Chief Ministers of Goa
Indian football executives
Indian sports executives and administrators
Indian football chairmen and investors